Campus DJ is a college-specific music competition held bi-annually in the United States.  Campus DJ invites students currently enrolled in a college or university to participate in its events.

Format & Rules
The Campus DJ format is similar to the NCAA basketball tournament.  Top college DJs and music producers compete at events in local college markets, before advancing onto the National Semi-Finals, and then the National Finale. The events reward winning college DJs with cash prizes, gear, and exposure.  The tour is also a sister-event to Campus MovieFest and previously also the College Battle of the Bands tours.

Notable past participants 
 2018 - DJ Vicious (CSUN) - 
 2017 - Matsu & Flores (Indiana U)
 2017 - Yi (Texas State U)
 2015 - Almand (Ithaca College)
 2015 - DJ Kurr (Florida State University)
 2015 - Jill Strange (Columbia College - Chicago)
 2014: Y2K (record producer) (ASU)
 2013: Flaxo, now known as Wingtip (Columbia U)
 Nate Howard Intro, MC and Host
 Flula Borg, MC and Host

Notable partnerships and prize partners
 Monster Energy Outbreak Tour
 College Football Playoff
 Chegg
 Universal Music Group
 Campus MovieFest
 Tinder (application)
 Fiverr
 Mini Countryman
 Chipotle Mexican Grill

Notable past guest judges or headliners
 Lupe Fiasco
 The Crystal Method
 The Chainsmokers
 Fetty Wap
 Grand Wizzard Theodore
 Cash Cash
 MAKJ
 Arty (musician)
 Mick Boogie
 Carnage (DJ)
 Elephante
 DJ Jayceeoh
 Skratch Bastid
 3LAU
 tyDi
 Andre Drummond
 ESPN's Music Director

References

External links

Music competitions in the United States